The Everett Railroad  is a shortline and heritage railroad that operates on ex-Pennsylvania Railroad trackage in the Hollidaysburg area of the U.S. state of Pennsylvania. It runs freight trains over two separate lines, one from Brooks Mill and Sproul, and the other, owned by the Morrison's Cove Railroad, from Roaring Spring to Curryville and Martinsburg.

The affiliated Hollidaysburg and Roaring Spring Railroad , which the Everett Railroad operates both under contract and via trackage rights, connects the two segments to each other and to the Norfolk Southern Railway (ex-Conrail) in Hollidaysburg. The Everett Railroad name refers to its former location near Everett, abandoned in 1982.

History
The Everett Railroad was incorporated in April 1954 to take over a portion of the Huntingdon and Broad Top Mountain Railroad and Coal Company (H&BT) near Everett, which was abandoned in May of that year. The line, which extended north from the end of the Pennsylvania Railroad's Mt. Dallas Branch at Mount Dallas to a point near Tatesville, parallel to PA Route 26, had been constructed from 1859 to 1863 by the Bedford Railroad, which was merged into the H&BT in 1864.

Conrail discontinued service on the then-Mt. Dallas Secondary in October 1982, severing the Everett Railroad's ties to the outside world and forcing its abandonment.

The company was revived in May 1984, when it acquired a part of Conrail's Bedford Secondary between Brooks Mill and Sproul. Completed in 1910 by the Bedford and Hollidaysburg Railroad, a predecessor of the Pennsylvania Railroad, this line had connected to the Mt. Dallas Secondary near Bedford until 1982.

A second line, the Morrison's Cove Secondary from Roaring Spring to Curryville, along with a short branch into Martinsburg, was acquired by the Morrison's Cove Railroad, organized by local shippers, in mid-1982. The shippers initially contracted with the Allegheny Southern Railway , which operated the line from September 1982 to the end of 1984, but on January 1, 1985, the Everett Railroad took over operations. This line had been constructed by the Pennsylvania Railroad itself in 1871.

Conrail continued to operate the remainder of the Morrison's Cove Secondary, from Roaring Spring through Brooks Mill to Hollidaysburg, until Alan W. Maples, owner of the Everett Railroad, organized the Hollidaysburg and Roaring Spring Railroad (H&RS) and bought the line in March 1995.
Simultaneously, the Everett Railroad acquired trackage rights to Hollidaysburg, and began operating the H&RS under contract.

Rolling stock

Currently rostered locomotives

Formerly rostered locomotives

References

External links

Everett Railroad Company

Pennsylvania railroads
Railway companies established in 1954
Spin-offs of Conrail
1982 establishments in Pennsylvania
American companies established in 1954
American companies established in 1982
Heritage railroads in Pennsylvania